Kiryat Ekron or Qiryath Eqron is a town located on the coastal plain in the Central District of Israel.

History
Kiryat Ekron was founded in 1948, as Kfar Ekron, on the site of the  Palestinian  village of Aqir, and was named after the biblical Ekron, a major Philistine city that is believed to have once existed at nearby Tel Mikne. After the war, new immigrants from Yemen and Bulgaria settled in the remaining houses. In November 1948, two ma'abarot were established on the village's lands; the Aqir ma'abara, and the Givat Brenner ma'abara. In 1953, the Aqir ma'abara was officially made part of Kfar Ekron, followed by the Givat Brenner ma'abara in 1955. From 1954 to 1963, Kfar Ekron belonged to the Givat Brenner regional council. In 1963, the name of the town was changed to Kiryat Ekron, and it became an independent local municipality.

Attempts to unite Kiryat Ekron with the much larger municipality of Rehovot in 2003 failed after popular protest from residents of the town, as did similar attempts to unite Kiryat Ekron's municipality with that of the town of Mazkeret Batya due to opposition from the smaller town's residents the same year (Mazkeret Batya was originally called Ekron, when founded in 1880s; its name was changed to Mazkeret Batya in 1887).

Economy
A large outlet mall, "Bilu Centre," is located in Kiryat Ekron. The centre was built up in the late 1990s on land that was formerly agricultural, particularly citrus groves.

Notable residents
Dudu Aharon, music artist

Twin towns
Kiryat Ekron is twinned with:
 Bussy-Saint-Georges, France
 Akron, Ohio, United States

References

External links

Local councils in Central District (Israel)
Populated places established in 1948
1948 establishments in Israel